Annie Hart may refer to:

 Annie Hart (Family Affairs), a fictional character in the British soap opera Family Affairs
 Annie Hart (musician), member of the American pop band Au Revoir Simone

See also
 Ann Hart (disambiguation)